The Wando River is a tidewater river in the coastal area of South Carolina. It begins in the town of Awendaw, Charleston County, and has its mouth at the Cooper River shortly before it flows into Charleston Harbor. Nearby Drum Island is uninhabited. It is spanned by the bridges crossing the Wando River and Towne creek.

The river was named for the Wando people, a band of the Cusabo.

References

Rivers of South Carolina
Rivers of Berkeley County, South Carolina
Rivers of Charleston County, South Carolina